Bae Sang-moon (born 21 June 1986), or Sang-moon Bae, is a South Korean professional golfer who plays on the PGA Tour.

Professional career
Bae turned professional in 2004. He won the 2006 Emerson Pacific Group Open on the Korean Tour, and in 2007 he won the SK Telecom Open, an Asian Tour and Korean Tour co-sanctioned event held in his home country. In 2008, he won his home country's open, the Kolon-Hana Bank Korea Open. In 2009, he won the GS Caltex Maekyung Open.

In 2011, Bae finished as the leading money winner on the Japan Golf Tour for the season after winning three tournaments. Bae was the second consecutive Korean to take this accolade after Kim Kyung-tae's success in 2010. His three victories all came within two months of each other at the Vana H Cup KBC Augusta, the Coca-Cola Tokai Classic and the Japan Open. At the end of the year, he competed at the PGA Tour Qualifying Tournament, where he finished T11 to secure his playing rights for the 2012 PGA Tour season. He also reached his career high world ranking of 26th in 2011.

Bae started the season very strongly, making all of his first eight cuts on the PGA Tour. He recorded his first top-10 finish of the year when he reached the quarter-finals at the 2012 WGC-Accenture Match Play Championship, knocking out Ian Poulter and Charl Schwartzel before losing to Rory McIlroy. In March 2012, Bae lost in a four-man playoff at the Transitions Championship on the PGA Tour. After finishing at −13 for the tournament, he lost the playoff when Luke Donald holed a birdie putt on the first extra hole to defeat Bae, Jim Furyk and Robert Garrigus. He finished his debut season making 17 out of 25 cuts and ended up 71st in the FedEx Cup standings, one position outside of qualifying for the third playoff event.

In May 2013, Bae won his first PGA Tour event at the HP Byron Nelson Championship, beating Keegan Bradley by two strokes. Bae entered the final round a single stroke behind Bradley, but birdied four out of his first seven holes to move four ahead. However Bae double-bogeyed the ninth after finding water and bogeyed the 10th and 15th to drop back to a share of the lead. Bae then proceeded to birdie the 16th and when Bradley bogeyed the 17th, Bae had a comfortable two shot lead to come down the 18th and secure his maiden victory. He became just the fourth South Korean-born winner on the PGA Tour, after K. J. Choi, Yang Yong-eun, and Kevin Na.

Bae was embroiled in political controversy late 2014 after his work visa expired and he had yet to serve twenty-one months in the South Korean military as required of men age 18–35. By comparison, K. J. Choi and Yang Yong-eun completed their military requirements before turning professional. Bae countered that he had residency in the U.S. and was exempt. In July 2015, a South Korean court ruled Bae spent too much time in South Korea to be exempt and must fulfill his military requirement. In response, the PGA Tour created a "Mandatory Obligation" category that would allow Bae to retain his exemption after completing his service, similar to the major medical exemption.

Bae earned an invitation to the 2015 Presidents Cup as a captain's pick by Nick Price. It was his last event before military service, which began in November 2015. His military service ended in August 2017.

Bae made his return to professional golf at the 2017 Shinhan Donghae Open, an event he won twice as a member of the Korean Tour. His PGA Tour return came at the Safeway Open. Bae finished 202nd in the FedEx Cup, but earned entry to the Web.com Tour Finals via his military exemption. He won the Albertsons Boise Open and regained his PGA Tour card for the 2018–19 season.

Professional wins (15)

PGA Tour wins (2)

PGA Tour playoff record (0–1)

Japan Golf Tour wins (3)

 The Japan Open Golf Championship is also a Japan major championship.

Japan Golf Tour playoff record (1–1)

Asian Tour wins (3)

1Co-sanctioned by the Korean Tour

Asian Tour playoff record (1–0)

Web.com Tour wins (1)

OneAsia Tour wins (2)

1Co-sanctioned by the Korean Tour

Korean Tour wins (9)

1Co-sanctioned by the Asian Tour
2Co-sanctioned by the OneAsia Tour

Other wins (1)
2008 Fortis International Challenge (Malaysia; with Kim Hyung-tae)

Results in major championships

CUT = missed the half-way cut
"T" = tied for place

Summary

Most consecutive cuts made – 2 (twice, current)
Longest streak of top-10s – 0

Results in The Players Championship

CUT = missed the halfway cut
"T" indicates a tie for a place

Results in World Golf Championships
Results not in chronological order before 2015.

QF, R16, R32, R64 = Round in which player lost in match play
"T" = tied

Team appearances
World Cup (representing South Korea): 2008, 2013
Royal Trophy (representing Asia): 2012 (winners)
Presidents Cup (representing the International team): 2015

See also
2011 PGA Tour Qualifying School graduates
2018 Web.com Tour Finals graduates

References

External links

South Korean male golfers
Asian Tour golfers
Japan Golf Tour golfers
PGA Tour golfers
Korn Ferry Tour graduates
Sportspeople from Daegu
South Korean Buddhists
1986 births
Living people